Boselaphus namadicus is an extinct species of bovid that lived in South Asia (India and Pakistan) from the Late Pliocene to the Mid Pleistocene.

Taxonomy
Boselaphus namadicus was first discovered in 1878, and was originally described as Portax namadicus. It was moved to Boselaphus less than a year later when similarities were found between it and the living nilgai.

Description
This species was larger than the modern nilgai. Its horn cores are slightly closer to the orbits compared to its living relative, with their inner keel farther inward and more to the front. Their teeth are hypsodont and indicate that it was a grazer.

Fossils of B. namadicus are known from the Siwaliks and are found in association with other large herbivores such as Equus sivalensis, Stegodon, rhinoceroses, and the straight-tusked elephant. The presence of B. namadicus and these other large herbivores indicate that the environment of the area at the time was dominated by open grassland.

References

Prehistoric bovids
Pliocene even-toed ungulates
Pleistocene even-toed ungulates
Pliocene mammals of Asia
Pleistocene mammals of Asia
Prehistoric mammals of Asia
Animals described in 1878